The Atlantic East Conference is an NCAA Division III collegiate athletic conference in the Mid-Atlantic region of the United States.

History

Beginning play in July 2018, the league consists of seven private universities, each former members of either the Capital Athletic Conference, since renamed the Coast to Coast Athletic Conference (C2C), or the Colonial States Athletic Conference (CSAC). The charter members consisted of Cabrini University, Gwynedd Mercy University, Immaculata University, Marymount University, Marywood University, Neumann University and Wesley College.

On May 31, 2018, Jessica Huntley was named the inaugural commissioner of the Atlantic East.

On September 16, 2019, the AEC announced its first affiliate member, St. Mary's College of Maryland, who would participate in field hockey starting in the 2020–21 season. This will ultimately be St. Mary's only season in AEC field hockey, as that school will join the North Eastern Athletic Conference (NEAC), which sponsors that sport, for 2021–22 and beyond. The United East Conference (formerly NEAC), reversed their decision to add field hockey, thus St. Mary's remained as an affiliate in the sport.

On November 19, 2019, it was announced that William Paterson University will become an affiliate member in men's golf starting in the 2019–20 season.

On January 12, 2020, it was announce that Cedar Crest College would join the AEC as an affiliate member in women's swimming & diving.

On August 17, 2020 and August 19, 2020, it was announced that Gallaudet University and St. Mary's College of Maryland, respectively, would also become an affiliate member in men's and women's swimming and diving.

On July 9, 2020, Delaware State University announced that it would acquire Wesley College starting in the 2021–22 school year, due to the financial struggles Wesley faced due to the COVID-19 pandemic.

On June 18, 2021, Centenary University announced its move to Atlantic East from the CSAC also in 2021–22. Centenary is the conference's first non-Catholic member institution.

On June 29, 2021, New Jersey City University announced that it would be joining the Atlantic East as an affiliate member in men's and women's golf starting in the 2021–22 season.

Chronological timeline
 2018 - The Atlantic East Conference was founded. Charter members included Cabrini University, Gwynedd Mercy University, Immaculata University, Marymount University, Marywood University, Neumann University and Wesley College, effective beginning the 2018-19 academic year.
 2019 - William Paterson University joined the Atlantic East as an associate member for men's golf, effective in the 2020 spring season (2019-20 academic year).
 2020 - Three institutions joined the Atlantic East as associate members: Gallaudet University for men's and women's swimming & diving, St. Mary's College of Maryland for field hockey and men's and women's swimming & diving, and Cedar Crest College for women's swimming & diving, all effective in the 2020-21 academic year.
 2021 - Wesley (Del.) left the Atlantic East as the school announced that it would be acquired by Delaware State University, therefore closing the school, effective after the 2020-21 academic year.
 2021 - Centenary College of New Jersey joined the Atlantic East, effective in the 2021-22 academic year.
 2021 - New Jersey City University joined the Atlantic East as an associate member for men's and women's golf, effective in the 2022 spring season (2021-22 academic year).

Member schools

Full members
The AEC currently has seven full members, all are private schools:

Associate members
The AEC currently has six associate members, half of them are public schools:

Former members
The Atlantic East had one former full member, which was also a private school:

Notes

Membership timeline

Sports
The Atlantic East sponsored 20 sports at its launch—nine for men and 11 for women.

Men's sponsored sports by school

Men's varsity sports not sponsored by the Atlantic East Conference that are played by Atlantic East schools

Women's sponsored sports by school

Notes

Women's varsity sports not sponsored by the Atlantic East Conference that are played by Atlantic East schools

Current Champions

References

External links